Arthur W. Jones (born July 15, 1891) was an American college football, basketball, and baseball player and coach. He served as the head football coach at Fresno State University in Fresno, California from 1921 to 1928.

Head coaching record

College football

References

1891 births
Year of death missing
American men's basketball players
Basketball coaches from Indiana
Fresno State Bulldogs baseball coaches
Fresno State Bulldogs football coaches
Fresno State Bulldogs men's basketball coaches
Indiana Hoosiers football players
Indiana Hoosiers men's basketball players
High school football coaches in Alabama
People from New Albany, Indiana